Wyoming is a city in Stark County, Illinois, United States. The population was 1,429 at the 2010 census, up from 1,424 in 2000. It is the headquarters of the Rock Island Trail State Park. Wyoming is part of the Peoria, Illinois Metropolitan Statistical Area. The former CB&Q Railroad depot in town is the Rock Island Trail State Park's headquarters.

History

The city of Wyoming was founded on May 3, 1836, by General Samuel Thomas, a veteran of the War of 1812. General Thomas was born in 1787 and died in 1879. He is buried in the Wyoming City Cemetery where a plaque below his stone denotes that he was the founder and benefactor of the town of Wyoming. The main city park in Wyoming is Thomas Park; there is also a Thomas Street in honor of General Thomas. Samuel Thomas as well as many of the other early settlers came from the state of Pennsylvania. It is for the Wyoming Valley in Pennsylvania that the city is named.

Stark County is rural, consisting mostly of farm land. The county was established on March 2, 1839, and named for John Stark, a soldier of the French and Indian wars and a Major General of the Continental Army during the American Revolution, serving with great distinction at Bunker Hill, Trenton, Princeton, and Bennington.

Wyoming is the largest community in Stark County, with 1,429 people as of the 2010 census. The other principal villages are Toulon, Bradford, Lafayette, Castleton, Camp Grove, West Jersey, Duncan, Stark, Speer, Milo, Elmira, Osceola, and Modena. Toulon is the county seat, and an historic courthouse is sited there.

Geography
Wyoming is located at  (41.063576, -89.774041).

Just west of Wyoming is Spoon River.

Demographics

As of the census of 2000, there were 1,424 people, 629 households, and 408 families residing in the city. The racial makeup of the city was 99.09% White, 0.21% Asian, and 0.70% from two or more races. Hispanic or Latino of any race were 0.07% of the population.

There were 629 households, out of which 26.1% had children under the age of 18 living with them, 53.1% were married couples living together, 8.9% had a female householder with no husband present, and 35.1% were non-families. 32.1% of all households were made up of individuals, and 17.6% had someone living alone who was 65 years of age or older. The average household size was 2.26 and the average family size was 2.84.

In the city, the population was spread out, with 22.3% under the age of 18, 7.7% from 18 to 24, 24.4% from 25 to 44, 23.9% from 45 to 64, and 21.6% who were 65 years of age or older. The median age was 42 years. For every 100 females, there were 85.7 males. For every 100 females age 18 and over, there were 84.0 males.

The median income for a household in the city was $30,463, and the median income for a family was $41,797. Males had a median income of $30,074 versus $22,115 for females. The per capita income for the city was $16,574. About 9.1% of families and 10.6% of the population were below the poverty line, including 13.5% of those under age 18 and 7.1% of those age 65 or over.

Schools
Stark County Elementary School and Stark County C.U.S.D. #100 offices are located in Wyoming.

Notable people
J. Frank Duryea, shares credit with brother Charles for designing the first gasoline-powered automobile built in the United States. Attended high school in Wyoming.
Otho Cromwell Duryea (1880–1941), born in Wyoming, brother of  Charles and J. Frank Duryea. President of the O. C. Duryea Corporation and pioneer developer of gasoline-powered automobiles
Kirke La Shelle, Wyoming born journalist, playwright and theatrical producer.
Arthur Melvin Otman, probate judge of Peoria County originally from Wyoming.
Harry Everett Townsend, Wyoming native who served as a war artist with the United States Army during the First World War.

References

Further reading
 M.A. Leeson, History of Stark County Illinois, 1887

Cities in Stark County, Illinois
Cities in Illinois
Peoria metropolitan area, Illinois
Populated places established in 1836
1836 establishments in Illinois